Protein arginine N-methyltransferase 2 is an enzyme that in humans is encoded by the PRMT2 gene.

Interactions
PRMT2 has been shown to interact with Estrogen receptor alpha and HNRPUL1.

References

Further reading